The Maldives national badminton team represents Maldives in international badminton team competitions. The Maldives have participated twice in the Badminton Asia Team Championships in 2016 and 2018 respectively. Both teams were eliminated in the group stages.

The Maldives made its badminton Olympic debut in the 2012 Summer Olympics when Mohamed Ajfan Rasheed received a wild card entry in men's singles.

Participation in Badminton Asia competitions 

Men's team

Women's team

Participation in Indian Ocean Island Games 
The Maldives national team participated in the Indian Ocean Island Games. The men's team were runners-up in 2015 and 2019 when they lost the final tie to Mauritius. The women's team were semifinalists in both editions.

Men's team

Women's team

Current squad 

Men
Ahmed Nibal
Hassan Afsheen Shaheem
Hussein Zayan Shaheed
Mohamed Aakif
Mohamed Arsalaan Ali
Mohamed Sarim
Mohamed Ajfan Rasheed

Women
Aminath Nabeeha Abdul Razzaq
Fathimath Nabaaha Abdul Razzaq
Maisa Fathuhulla Ismail
Moosa Aminath Shahurunaz
Nafha Nasrullah
Neela Najeeb

References

Badminton
National badminton teams
Badminton in the Maldives